Natagaima is a town and municipality in the Tolima department of Colombia, on the shore of the Magdalena River, at  above sea level. Natagaima was founded in 1606 by Spanish conqueror Juan de Borja y Armendia.

Etymology
Some believe the name of Natagaima comes from the words Nataga ("Cacique", Tribal Chief) and Ima (land), while others state that the name was created because there was an Indian named Nataga, who was the chief of this region, and married Queen Ima, ruler of the Tribal Chiefs of the center of Tolima.

Limits
North: Coyaima and Prado, East: Dolores and Alpujarra, West: Ataco and Coyaima, South: Aipe(Huila).
Distance from Ibagué(capital of Tolima): .

Population and economic activities
Its economy consists mainly in agriculture, an activity induced by its hot weather. The main agricultural products are rice, cotton, corn and sorghum. Besides agriculture, breeding of livestock occupies an important place in the economy of Natagaima, specially that of the Zebu species.

Other economical activities include craftsmanship and saddlery.

History
The people of Natagaima were submitted by Spanish Conqueror Juan the Borja, who gathered the survivors of this incursion and proceeded with the foundation of the town. It is said that Natagaima lies in a place different from his original location, and was moved there by orders of the priest Ignacio Navarro in 1801. From 1863 to 1866 it was the capital of the Sovereign State of Tolima.
Through a law emitted on February 21, 1963, it became a Municipality, starting its role on January 1, 1964.

Its territory was initially inhabited by the Pijao Indians, that were mainly composed by the Natagaima and Coyaima communities, tough warriors who posed fierce resistance to the Spanish invasion, forcing the Spaniards to establish an extermination policy. Other local tribes were the Dujos and Babadujos, who continuously fought against the Natagaimas and Coyaimas, and, motivated by the overwhelming quantity of received attacks, ultimately decided to support the Spaniards.

Typical foods
Tamale (Tolimense), almojábana, yucca bread with oats, Lechona, bizcochuelo, Mistela, Chanfaina, Corn Chicha, Masato, Poporoi are the most important dishes of the zone.

Typical songs
Among many others, La caña(Cantalicio Rojas), El contrabandista and El pasamanos, are famous songs that are danced during the festivities.

Sites of interest
Pacandé Mountain, The Painima Bath Zone, The Patá(la Palmita) Bath Zone, The Anchique River, The Hipogeo Indian Cemetery (vereda Palma Alta), and the Magdalena River crossing.

Health
San Antonio Hospital (a "first level" hospital).

Education

Primary
1 May Urban Mixed School
Maria Auxiliadora Urban Mixed School
Gabriel Rebeis Pizarro Urban Mixed School
Gustavo Perdomo Ávila Urban Mixed School

Secondary
Francisco José de Caldas School
Alfonzo Reyes Echandia School
Luis Carlos Galan Sarmiento School

Rural schools
Rural and Agricultural Development School Anchique
Policarpa Salavarrieta Basic Education Institute
La Palmita Rural Mixed School
New Town Adult Centre
Mariano Ospina Perez Institute

Notable persons
Teófilo Forero, politician and trade unionist
Rafael Godoy, composer
Cantalicio Rojas
IndiaMeliyara

Municipalities of Tolima Department